Buck Island is a privately owned island of the British Virgin Islands in the Caribbean.

History

Buck Island was purchased and developed by Carl & Sharon Nilsen from 1998-2008. The couple spent 10 years building the roads and multi-structure buildings that resemble a castle made from the natural stones on the property. Hurricane Irma and Maria hit the British Virgin Islands in 2017 causing considerable damage to the territory.   

The private island has since been purchased by serial entrepreneur and humanitarian Britnie Faith Turner and is used as what is coined as Force for Good. The island is designed to elevate people and their purpose. Hosting very out-of-the-box summits and attracting people who aim to make the world a better place, what is now called The Aerial BVI is changing the way travel is even done. 

New owner, Britnie Turner married Veteran Green Beret Jeremy Locke as the first wedding on the island January 8, 2022. The couple use the island as a space of healing for veterans, caretakers and survivors of various kinds of abuse as well as work with local non-profits to host educational programs for gardening and equine therapy.

The island has a long strip of flat land which was the BVI’s first airstrip.

References

External links

Private islands of the British Virgin Islands